Paul Bacon could refer to:

Paul Bacon (designer) (1923–2015), American graphic designer
Paul Bacon (footballer) (born 1970), English footballer
Paul Bacon (politician) (1907–1999), French politician